The MW Motors Luka EV is an electric  car designed and produced by MW Motors in the Czech Republic since the 2010s. 

The Luka EV is unusual in having four wheel hub motors instead of a central electric motor. The body is inspired by the Tatra JK 2500 prototype and is made from fibreglass on an aluminium chassis.

Charging the battery takes 9 hours from a domestic single phase 220 VAC socket or 2 hours with a 3-phase rapid charger.

The MRK I and II prototypes were hand built as open source projects on Hackaday. The final production MRK III follows the previous cars closely but the details are closed source.

The MRK I prototype was nominated, together with five other vehicles, for the eCarTec Award 2015 in the Electric Vehicle category.

References

External links

 https://github.com/MWMotors/Car

Coupés
Electric sports cars
Electric concept cars
All-wheel-drive vehicles
Production electric cars